Haghenbeck is a surname. Notable people with the surname include:

Francisco Haghenbeck (1965–2021), Mexican writer and comics screenwriter
José Antonio Haghenbeck (born 1955), Mexican surgeon, physician, and politician

See also
Hagenbeck (disambiguation)